The 24th Filipino Academy of Movie Arts and Sciences Awards Night was held in 1976.  This is for the outstanding achievements in Filipino film for 1975.

Maynila.. Sa Kuko ng Liwanag of Cinema Artist was the most nominated  with eleven (11) nominations and the most awarded with 9 wins including FAMAS Award for Best Picture and the Best Director for Lino Brocka. This is the second year in a row for Brocka to win both Best Director and his film as Best Picture.

This year, FAMAS  elevated five (5) individuals to Hall of Famer Status for winning a specific award 5 times or more. They are Eddie Garcia for Best Supporting Actor, Gerardo de Leon for Best Director, Tony Maiquez for Musical Scorer, Angel Avellana and Demetrio de Santos for Best in Sound Recording.

Awards

Major Awards
Winners are listed first and highlighted with boldface.

{| class=wikitable
|-
! style="background:#EEDD82; width:50%" | Best Picture
! style="background:#EEDD82; width:50%" | Best Director
|-
| valign="top" |
 Maynila.. Sa Kuko ng Liwanag — Cinema Arts Banaue: Stairway to the Sky — NV Productions 
 Hatulan kung Kasalanan — Emperor FIlms 
 Lumapit, lumayo ang umaga — Lea Productions 
 Saan ka Pupunta, Miss Lutgarda Nicolas?: — Silver Films
| valign="top" |
 Lino Brocka — Maynila.. Sa Kuko ng Liwanag
 Fernando Poe Jr. — Alupihang Dagat 
 Augusto Buenaventura — Diligin Mo ng Hamog ang Uhaw na Lupa 
 Ishmael Bernal — Lumapit, Lumayo ang Umaga 
|-
! style="background:#EEDD82; width:50%" | Best Actor
! style="background:#EEDD82; width:50%" | Best Actress
|-
| valign="top" |
 Bembol Roco — Maynila.. Sa Kuko ng Liwanag
 Christopher De Leon — Banaue: Stairway to the Sky
 Dante Rivero — Lumapit, lumayo ang umaga 
 George Estregan — Lumapit, lumayo ang Umaga 
 Eddie Garcia — Mister Mo, Lover Boy Ko 
| valign="top" |
 Elizabeth Oropesa — Lumapit, lumayo ang Umaga
 Nora Aunor — Banaue: Stairway to the Sky 
 Charito Solis — Araw-araw, Gabi-gabi: 
 Hilda Koronel — Maynila.. Sa Kuko ng Liwanag 
 Boots Anson-Roa — Saan ka Pupunta, Miss Lutgarda Nicolas? 
|-
! style="background:#EEDD82; width:50%" | Best Supporting Actor
! style="background:#EEDD82; width:50%" | Best Supporting Actress
|-
| valign="top" |
 Tommy Abuel — Maynila.. Sa Kuko ng Liwanag
 Tony Santos — Araw-araw, Gabi-gabi 
 Johnny Delgado — Banaue: Stairway to the Sky 
 Vic Silayan — Diligin mo ng hamog ang uhaw na Lupa 
 Lito Anzures — Ang madugong daigdig ni Salvacion 
| valign="top" |
 Anna Gonzales — Sa kagubatan ng Lunsod
 Rosanna Ortiz — Ala-ala Mo, daigdig ko 
 Gloria Sevilla — Banaue: Stairway to the Sky 
 Lily Gamboa Mendoza — Maynila.. Sa Kuko ng Liwanag 
 Paraluman — Mister Mo, Lover Boy Ko 
|-
! style="background:#EEDD82; width:50%" | Best Child Performer
! style="background:#EEDD82; width:50%" | Best Theme Song
|-
| valign="top" |
  Melissa Sarosario — Araw-Araw, Gabi-Gab
 Mercy Bartolome — Banaue: Stairway to the Sky 
 Eddie Villamayor — Banaue: Stairway to the Sky''
 | valign="top" |
 Willy Cruz  — Araw-Araw, Gabi-Gabi 
|-
! style="background:#EEDD82; width:50%" | Best in Screenplay
! style="background:#EEDD82; width:50%" | Best Story
|-
| valign="top" |
 Clodualdo Del Mundo Jr. — Maynila.. Sa Kuko ng Liwanag| valign="top" |
  Edgardo M. Reyes — Maynila.. Sa Kuko ng Liwanag 
|-
! style="background:#EEDD82; width:50%" | Best Sound 
! style="background:#EEDD82; width:50%" | Best Musical Score
|-
| valign="top" |
   Ramon Reyes — Maynila.. Sa Kuko ng Liwanag 
| valign="top" |
  Ernani Cuenco  — Diligin mo ng hamog ang uhaw na Lupa 
|-
! style="background:#EEDD82; width:50%" | Best Cinematography 
! style="background:#EEDD82; width:50%" | Best Production Design
|-
| valign="top" |
   Mike de Leon — Maynila.. Sa Kuko ng Liwanag| valign="top" |
   — Banaue: Stairway to the Sky|-
! style="background:#EEDD82; width:50%" | Best Editing
! style="background:#EEDD82; width:50%" | Best Production Design
|-
| valign="top" |
  Ike Jarlego, Jr. — Maynila.. Sa Kuko ng Liwanag| valign="top" |
   — Banaue: Stairway to the Sky|-
|}

Special AwardeeDr. Ciriaco Santiago Memorial Award 
 Teodoro ValenciaLou Salvador, Sr. Memorial Award PugoSpecial Award 
 Lamberto V. Avellana & Joseph EstradaPosthumous Awards:Guillermo C. de Vega (Presidential Assistant) & Chairman, Board of CensorsRomeo Arceo ~ Former Famas PresidentDr. Jose R. Perez ~ (producer, Sampaguita Pictures, Inc.)Hall of Fame AwardeesEddie Garcia - Supporting Actor1973 - Nueva Vizcaya
1969 - Patria Adorada
1966 - Ito Ang Pilipino
1959 - Tanikalang Apoy
1958 - Condenado
1957 - Taga Sa BatoGerardo de Leon - Director1971 - Lilet
1965 - Ang Daigdig Ng Mga Api
1962 - El Filibusterismo
1961 - Noli me Tangere
1960 - Huwag Mo Akong Limutin
1958 - Hanggang Sa Dulo Ng Daigdig
1952 - Bagong UmagaTony Maiquez - Musical Score1967 - Kapag Puso'y Sinugatan
1965 - Iginuhit Sa Buhangin
1963 - Sapagka't Kami'y Tao Lamang
1958 - Water Lily
1957 - Yaya Maria
1956 - 5 Hermanos
1955 - Pandora
1954 - GuwapoAngel Avellana - Sound Recording1974 - Ang Pinakamagandang Hayop Sa Balat Ng Lupa
1973 - Hanggang Sa Kabila Ng Daigdig
1972 - Kill The Pushers
1971 - Asedillo
1969 - Pinagbuklod Ng LangitDemetrio de Santos - Sound Recording'''

1970 - Rodolfo Valentino
1966 - The Passionate Strangers
1960 - Huwag Mo Akong Limutin
1958 - The Singing Idol
1957 - Kalibre .45
1956 - Desperado

References

External links
FAMAS Awards 

FAMAS Award
FAMAS
FAMAS